James Smith (born 20 November 1980 in Alexandria) is a Scottish retired professional footballer and currently Executive Director at
Tennessee United Soccer Club. Prior to this, Smith served as Academy Director for Nashville SC. Smith spent the majority of his playing career in his native country with Celtic and Aberdeen in the Scottish Premier League. He was also capped twice by Scotland.

Playing career

Early career 
Born in Alexandria, West Dunbartonshire, Smith started his career with Celtic; a graduate of the club's youth system, he played 66 games and scored six goals in all competitions across his five years as a senior player. Smith  won three major honours (two league titles and the League Cup in 2001) and was an unused substitute in the 2003 UEFA Cup Final, but limited first team opportunities saw him join Dutch club ADO Den Haag in July 2004, spending one season there.

Aberdeen
He returned to Scotland in season 2005–06 with Aberdeen. In August 2005, Smith struck a late winner as the Dons defeated rivals Rangers in a league match for the first time since April 1998, wowing the Aberdeen support in only his third competitive game for the club. He was involved in a car crash along with teammate Michael Hart in July 2007, while on a pre-season tour of Egypt. Smith was treated for concussion, while Hart was unhurt.

In December 2007, Smith played a key role in Aberdeen's victory over Danish team FC Copenhagen in the 2007–08 UEFA Cup, scoring two goals in the 4–0 victory that saw Aberdeen through to the last 32 of the competition. Smith's contract at Aberdeen ended at the end of the 2008–09 season and he expressed concern that he had not been offered a contract extension, stating that he may need to look for a new club in summer.

Colorado Rapids
In May 2009, he was given permission to discuss a contract with Major League Soccer side Toronto FC. However, Toronto passed on the signing of Smith and he later signed with Colorado Rapids in July 2009. In his first season with the Rapids he played only four games before suffering a season-ending knee injury.

On 28 August 2010, Smith scored his first MLS goal two minutes into a match against Houston in which he was named man of the match.

Smith remained with Colorado through the 2012 season. After the conclusion of the 2012 season, Colorado declined the 2013 option on Smith's contract and he entered the 2012 MLS Re-Entry Draft. Smith became a free agent after he went undrafted in both rounds of the draft.

Smith was re-signed by Colorado on 8 February 2013.

On 10 January 2014, Smith announced his retirement from playing and joined Colorado Rapids academy coaching staff.

International
Smith made two appearances for Scotland in 2003, in friendly matches against Austria and Ireland. He later played twice for
Scotland B.

Coaching career
After retiring from playing, he joined the coaching staff of Colorado Rapids as U23 mananger in 2014. 

He had a spell as Academy manager of Continental FC before being appointed to the same role at Nashville SC in 2019.

Personal life

His brother-in-law, Allan Sieczkowski, is the lead singer of the Scottish rock band Little Eye. Colorado Rapids used their song Burgundy Sky as their official anthem to reflect on their famous burgundy kits.

Honours
 Celtic
 Scottish Premier League: 2002, 2004
 Scottish League Cup: 2001
 UEFA Cup: Runner-up 2002–03

 Colorado Rapids
 Major League Soccer
 Eastern Conference Championship: 2010
 MLS Cup: 2010

References

External links
 
 
 
Profile and stats at AFC Heritage Trust
Player profile at The Celtic Wiki

1980 births
Living people
Scottish footballers
Scotland international footballers
Scotland B international footballers
Scottish Premier League players
Scottish Football League players
Eredivisie players
Major League Soccer players
Celtic F.C. players
Livingston F.C. players
ADO Den Haag players
Aberdeen F.C. players
Colorado Rapids players
Expatriate footballers in the Netherlands
Expatriate soccer players in the United States
Scottish expatriate sportspeople in the United States
Scottish expatriate sportspeople in the Netherlands
Scottish expatriate footballers
People from Alexandria, West Dunbartonshire
Colorado Rapids non-playing staff
Nashville SC non-playing staff
Association football wingers
Footballers from West Dunbartonshire